Walter Kasper (born 5 March 1933) is a German Catholic cardinal and theologian. He is President Emeritus of the Pontifical Council for Promoting Christian Unity, having served as its president from 2001 to 2010.

Early life
Born in Heidenheim an der Brenz, Germany, Kasper was ordained a priest on 6 April 1957 by Bishop Carl Leiprecht of Rottenburg.

From 1957 to 1958 he was a parochial vicar in Stuttgart. He returned to his studies and earned a doctorate in dogmatic theology from the University of Tübingen. He was a faculty member at Tübingen from 1958 to 1961 and worked for three years as an assistant to Leo Scheffczyk and Hans Küng, who was banned from teaching by Vatican authorities because of his views on contraception and papal infallibility.

He later taught dogmatic theology at the University of Münster (1964–1970), rising to become dean of the theological faculty in 1969 and then the same in Tübingen in 1970. In 1983 Kasper taught as a visiting professor at The Catholic University of America. He was editor of the Lexikon für Theologie und Kirche.

Bishop of Rottenburg-Stuttgart
Kasper was named Bishop of Rottenburg-Stuttgart, Germany's fourth largest Catholic diocese, on 17 April 1989. He was consecrated as a bishop on 17 June that same year by Archbishop Oskar Saier of Freiburg im Breisgau; Bishops Karl Lehmann and Franz Kuhnle served as co-consecrators. In 1993 he and other members of the German episcopate signed a pastoral letter which urged allowing divorced and civilly remarried German Catholics to return to the sacraments, to the disapproval of then Cardinal Ratzinger and Pope John Paul II. In 1994, he was named co-chair of the International Commission for Lutheran-Catholic Dialogue.

Cardinal
He was elevated to the cardinalate by Pope John Paul II in the consistory of 21 February 2001, as Cardinal-Deacon of Ognissanti in Via Appia Nuova.

Kasper was one of a dozen or more like-minded cardinals and bishops who met annually from 1995 to 2006 in St. Gallen, Switzerland, to discuss reforms with respect to the appointment of bishops, collegiality, bishops' conferences, and the primacy of the papacy as well as the Church's approach to sexual morality. They differed among themselves in varying degrees, but shared the view that Cardinal Joseph Ratzinger was not the candidate they hoped to see elected at the next conclave.

Upon the death of John Paul II on 2 April 2005, Kasper and all major Vatican officials automatically lost their positions pending the election of a new pope. He was a cardinal elector in the 2005 papal conclave. On the following 21 April, Pope Benedict XVI confirmed him as President of the Pontifical Council for Promoting Christian Unity.

On 21 February 2011 he was promoted to Cardinal-Priest, having made the option for such. Therefore, the church of Ognissanti became a pro hac vice title, but will again be a cardinal diaconate for his future successor there.

Kasper was the oldest cardinal eligible to vote in the Papal conclave of 2013, having been 79 when the Papacy became vacant. His 80th birthday was on 5 March 2013, a few days after the resignation of Pope Benedict XVI. His eligibility to serve as an elector ended when that conclave concluded.

Pontifical Council for Promoting Christian Unity
On 3 March 1999, Kasper was appointed Secretary of the Pontifical Council for Promoting Christian Unity – and as such, President of the Pontifical Commission for Religious Relations with the Jews – and resigned from his post in Rottenburg-Stuttgart.

Reconciliation with Jews
Kasper recognized that the Congregation for the Doctrine of the Faith document Dominus Iesus (2000) was offensive to many Jewish people and was thus somewhat critical of its presentation. However, he affirmed the validity of its content, and called it "not the end of dialogue but a challenge for a further and even more intensive dialogue" between Catholics and Jews.

In 2003, he wrote a text called Anti-semitism: A wound to be healed for the European Day of Jewish Culture. On 10 July 2004, at the Latin-American Rabbinical Seminary of Buenos Aires, the International Raoul Wallenberg Foundation and the Angelo Roncalli Committee presented Kasper the "Memorial Mural Award" for his lifetime dedication to the causes of understanding and reconciliation between Jews and Catholics.

International Theological Commission
Kasper was a member of the International Theological Commission, an advisory body to the Congregation of the Doctrine of the Faith. On several occasions, in his capacity of President of the Pontifical Council for Promoting Christian Unity, he led the annual official delegation of the Holy See to the Ecumenical Patriarchate in Constantinople for the Feast of St Andrew the Apostle. In August 2007, he led the Catholic delegation to the funeral of Patriarch Teoctist of the Romanian Orthodox Church.

Society of Saint Pius X
In January 2009, Kasper told The New York Times that he had little, if any, input on whether to lift the excommunication of four bishops of the Society of Saint Pius X. Kasper was distancing himself from the scandal that ensued when it transpired that one of the bishops, Richard Williamson, was found to have claimed that reports about The Holocaust were exaggerated and that no Jews died in Nazi gas chambers. As the Vatican official responsible for relations with the Jewish religion, Kasper felt it necessary to comment on the action and the process leading up to the lifting of the excommunications. He said that: "Up to now people in the Vatican have spoken too little with each other and have not checked where problems might arise." He said that in lifting the excommunications "there were misunderstandings and management errors in the Curia."

Comments on Britain
In September 2010, Cardinal Kasper withdrew from the papal visit to Great Britain, after reportedly saying that Heathrow Airport gives the impression of a Third World country and that the United Kingdom is marked by "a new and aggressive atheism". In an interview with a German magazine, he was quoted as saying: "When you land at Heathrow you think at times you have landed in a Third World country". Kasper's secretary explained it as "a description of the many different people that live in Britain at the moment". He said that when one wears a cross on the British Airways "you are discriminated against", a reference to the British Airways cross controversy. British Airways said that Kasper had been "seriously misinformed" in his claims about the airline, and that "It is completely untrue that we discriminate against Christians or members of any faith".

A spokesman for the Church in Britain said that Kasper's remarks were not the views of the Vatican or of the Church. The cardinal's secretary said that Kasper had decided not to travel because gout made it difficult for him to walk. He also explained the cardinal used "aggressive atheism" to describe people like Richard Dawkins, a prominent atheist, who have been very critical of the Pope and talked about making a "citizens arrest" of the Pope while in Britain.

Criticism of the Church of England and the Anglican Communion
Cardinal Kasper has criticized the Church of England policies in relation to female priests and the elevation of women to the episcopate. He expressed his views in the address given to the Church of England Bishops' Meeting at 5 June 2006. He said that the ordination of women as bishops would "call into question what was recognized by the Second Vatican Council (Unitatis Redintegratio, 13), that the Anglican Communion occupied 'a special place' among churches and ecclesial communities of the West." He warned that the "restoration of full Church communion ... would realistically no longer exist following the introduction of the ordination of women to episcopal office." He spoke at the 2008 Lambeth Conference, criticizing sharply the departures from Christian orthodoxy taken on women clergy and episcopate and even more by some member churches of the Anglican Communion on allowing the blessing of same-sex unions and non-celibate homosexual clergy. He called at the occasion for a new Oxford Movement to rise among Anglicanism.

Pope Francis
Pope Francis, on 17 March 2013, four days after his election as Pope, called Kasper "a clever theologian, a good theologian", in the course of a sermon in which he reported that Kasper's book on mercy "did me a lot of good".

Proposal of admission at communion of remarried couples
Cardinal Kasper's proposal to admit to communion the Roman Catholic couples who have remarried, while still being legally married according to the Church's doctrine, is the most controversial question in which he has been involved in so far during the pontificate of Pope Francis. On 21 February 2014, Kasper said at the cardinals Consistory held in Rome that "The Church cannot question the words of Jesus on the indissolubility of marriage. Whoever expects the Consistory and the Synod to come up with 'easy', general solutions that apply to everyone, are mistaken. But given the difficulties which families today face and the huge rise in the number of failed marriages, new paths can be explored in order to respond to the deep needs of divorced people who have remarried as part of a civil union, who recognise their failure, convert and after a period of penance ask to be re-admitted to the sacraments." The proposal was met with hostility by some members of the college of cardinals, including Gerhard Müller, Raymond Burke, Walter Brandmüller, Carlo Caffarra and Velasio De Paolis, who co-authored the book Remaining in the Truth of Christ: Marriage and Communion in the Catholic Church, released in English in October 2014, to refute Kasper's proposal. Kasper later admitted that he didn't have Pope Francis' support on his proposal. He praised Pope Francis' apostolic exhortation Amoris Laetitia, saying that the correct interpretation is that it allows the admission of divorced and remarried people to communion in some individual cases.

2014 General Synod
During the Third Extraordinary General Assembly of the Synod of Bishops in 2014, Cardinal Kasper told reporters that since African, Asian, and Middle Eastern countries have a "taboo" against homosexuality, "they should not tell us too much what we have to do." Once the story broke, he denied that he made any such comment. The reporter who wrote the story, Edward Pentin, subsequently produced a recording of the conversation, which verified that the Cardinal had made those statements. Cardinal Raymond Burke called Kasper's remarks "profoundly sad and scandalous". Kasper subsequently confirmed that he had had the conversation, and offered this response for one of his remarks:
 Kasper also said parts of the Catholic media were engaged in a "deliberate dirty tricks" campaign against him, and said that "The fact that Catholic media (and unfortunately a cardinal in person) should participate in it, in order to tear down another position morally, is shameful."

On Jesus Christ
In his book The God of Jesus Christ, Kasper concluded that what Jesus effected was to give suffering "eternal import, the import of love." Kasper points out that Gregory of Nyssa and Augustine of Hippo, working out of the New Testament, speak of a God who can freely choose to feel compassion, which implies suffering. Kasper adds that: "It is Origen who gave us the clearest statement. In Origen's words: 'First God suffered, then he came down. What was the suffering he accepted for us? The suffering of love.' Origen adds that it is not just the Son but also the Father who suffers so. This is made possible by God's freedom in love."

Cardinal Kasper's book Jesus The Christ (1974) treats Christology in three manners: a contemporary approach, a historical approach and a factual approach. After these three approaches have been exhausted, the Christological themes of resurrection, mystery, and priesthood are treated. Ecclesiology is seen as part of Christology in this book because the Church is oriented towards Christ in his person, since Christ did not only say things, but he also did things.

Works

References

Further reading
 
Antonio Russo, Walter Kasper, in Enciclopedia filosofica, Milano, Bompiani, 2006
Antonio Russo, Walter Kasper: Chiesa cattolica. Essenza, realtà, missione, in «Studium», 5, 2012, pp. 761–77
Antonio Russo, Walter Kasper e Martin Lutero in prospettiva ecumenica, in «Studium», 4, 2016, pp. 626–63
Antonio Russo, Walter Kasper tra scienza ed ecclesiologia, in «Osservatore Romano» del 4 marzo 2018, p. 6
Antonio Russo, Walter Kasper. Cattolicismo vivente sotto la parola di Dio , Roma, Edizioni Studium, 2018.
Antonio Russo, Schelling and Twentieth Century Catholic Theology. The case of Walter Kasper, in «International Journal of Philosophy and Theology», 1–2, 2019, pp. 160–177.

External links

 
Antonio Russo, Walter Kasper, in Enciclopedia filosofica, Milano, Bompiani, 2006.
Atonio Russo, Walter Kasper: Chiesa cattolica. Essenza, realtà, missione, in «Studium», 5, 2012, pp. 761–774
Antonio Russo, Walter Kasper e Martin Lutero in prospettiva ecumenica, in «Studium», 4, 2016, pp. 626–631
Antonio Russo, Walter Kasper tra scienza ed ecclesiologia, in «Osservatore Romano» del 4 marzo 2018, p. 6.
Antonio Russo, Walter Kasper. Cattolicismo vivente sotto la parola di Dio , Roma, Edizioni Studium, 2018.
Antonio Russo, Schelling and Twentieth Century Catholic Theology. The case of Walter Kasper, in «International Journal of Philosophy and Theology», 1–2, 2019, pp. 160–177.
Kasper's biography at catholic-pages.com
 Kasper's views on Dominus Iesus
 "Islam is a Different Culture". SPIEGEL ONLINE: Interview with Cardinal Walter Kasper, 18 September 2006.

21st-century German cardinals
1933 births
Living people
People from Heidenheim
Roman Catholic bishops of Rottenburg
20th-century German Roman Catholic bishops
Pontifical Council for Promoting Christian Unity
Grand Crosses with Star and Sash of the Order of Merit of the Federal Republic of Germany
Recipients of the Order of Merit of Baden-Württemberg
International Theological Commission
Cardinals created by Pope John Paul II
Academic staff of the University of Münster
Catholic University of America faculty
20th-century German Roman Catholic priests